Parkdale High School (PHS) is a public high school located in Riverdale Park, Maryland, United States.  It is part of the Prince George's County Public Schools system. Enrollment was 2,354 students in grades nine through twelve as of 2020.

Parkdale High School serves: portions of Riverdale Park and East Riverdale, all of Woodlawn, and the majority of New Carrollton.

It hosts an International Baccalaureate (IB) magnet program.

History
Parkdale High School opened on February 1, 1968.

Principals
 G Allen Sager (1968–1977)
 Charles C Cockrell (1977–1981)
 James V Foran (1981– )
 Alonzo Grigsby (c 1984– )
 William LeFevre (c 1988–1999)
 Donald Horrigan (2000–2006)
 David P Burton (2006–2010)
 Cheryl Logan (2010–2013)
 Tanya Washington (2013–2016)
 Tasha Graves-Henderson (2016– )

Notable alumni
Sugar Ray Leonard
Moses Nyeman — professional soccer player for D.C. United (entered with class of 2017; did not graduate)
Jimmy Myrick Jr. — former special Olympics athlete

Sports 
 Baseball
 Basketball (boys and girls)
 Bocce
 Cross country
 Cheerleading
 Football
 Golf
 Lacrosse (boys and girls)
 Soccer (boys and girls)
 Softball
 Swimming (boys and girls)
 Tennis (boys and girls)
 Track and field (boys and girls)
 Volleyball 
 Wrestling

Demographics 
Population of Parkdale High School (as of June 2020).

See also
Parkdale High School Facts & Figures
Parkdale High School Official Website
PGCPS School Finder provides an interactive School Boundaries Map

References

Magnet schools in Maryland
Public high schools in Maryland
Riverdale Park, Maryland
Schools in Prince George's County, Maryland